Enneapterygius williamsi, known commonly as the William's triplefin, is a species of triplefin blenny in the genus Enneapterygius. It was described by Ronald Fricke in 1997. Its specific name honours the collector of the type, the ichthyologist Jeffrey T. Williams of the Smithsonian Institution.

References

williamsi
Fish described in 1997